Thomas Angell (29 December 1692 – 19 September 1767) was a Norwegian merchant, estate owner, mine owner and philanthropist.

Biography
Thomas Angell was born in Trondheim, the son of merchant Albert Lorenzen Angell. He was educated  in theology in Copenhagen.  Angell inherited a large fortune from his parents, who belonged to a wealthy trading family with roots in Southern Schleswig.  Together with his brother Lorentz Angell (1690–1751), Thomas Angell managed the estate of the Angell family. The business activities eventually included saw mills, shipping companies and the export of various commodities. In addition the Angell brothers owned and  managed their interests in the Røros Copper Works.

Thomas Angell  donated his fortune to a charity trust fund through his will. The trust fund is administered by the Thomas Angell Foundations (Thomas Angells Stiftelser). Thomas Angell House, a large building complex in Trondheim with apartments for the elderly, was built by the Thomas Angell Foundation between the years 1770 and 1772. The building also provides offices for administration of the Thomas Angell Foundation.

References

External links
Thomas Angell Foundation
Thomas Angell House

Other sources
Bull, Ida  (1992)  Thomas Angell – kapitalisten som ble hjembyens velgjører (Trondheim: Thomas Angells stiftelser)

Related Reading
Thomas Angell by Olaf Kringhaug 
Ida Bull (2006) Immigrating Merchants to Trondheim in the 18th Century 

1692 births
1767 deaths
People from Trondheim
Norwegian merchants
Norwegian people of English descent
18th-century Norwegian businesspeople